Paring may refer to:

 Paring Abbey, a Benedictine monastery
 Paring knife, a small knife with a plain edge blade

See also

 Pare (disambiguation)
 Pares (disambiguation)